The Coalition of Theatres of Color launched in 2004 to address funding and visibility inequity among theaters of color. Two key founding figures were 
Ossie Davis and Ruby Dee and the inaugural groups comprised twelve ethnically specific, multicultural theatrical and cultural institutions that were more than twenty five years old but whose budgets were less than $250,000 per year. The organizers worked to achieve annual funding for the collective via the New York City Council.

Members
As of 2016, the member organizations included the following:

AUDELCO
Black Spectrum Theatre
Billie Holiday Theatre 
Mind-Builders Creative Arts Center
National Black Theatre
The Negro Ensemble Company
New Federal Theatre
New Heritage Theatre Group
Pan Asian Repertory Theatre

References

Organizations established in 2004